The Lloyds Bank is an historic building situated at 53 & 55 Corn Street in Bristol, England.

Originally the West of England and South Wales Bank built by Bristol architects William Bruce Gingell (1819–1899) and T.R. Lysaght in 1854. Gingell was one of the most progressive Bristol architects of the latter part of the nineteenth century. He went on to design the General Hospital. Gingell is said to have used St Mark's library in Venice as a starting point for this building. The sumptuous friezes by are by John Thomas (1813–1862). John Thomas had been responsible for overseeing the carving on Charles Barry's new Houses of Parliament. On the ground floor the crests of Newport, Bath, Bristol, Exeter, and Cardiff are shown – the main towns from where the bank operated. On the first floor the ‘elements and sources of wealth’ are symbolised by life-size figures. They include: justice and integrity; education and charity;  peace and plenty; art and science; commerce, navigation and commerce.  And above this chubby cherubs depict the activities of the bank:  receiving, paying, storing, coining money, engraving and printing, and trading with Africa and America.

The adornment was intended to emphasize the wealth, and therefore financial stability, of the bank. It didn't stop the bank going bust, however, twenty years later in 1878.

The opulent interior features Corinthian columns.

It is a grade II* listed building and formerly housed a branch of the Lloyds Bank.

It is now a 42-room boutique hotel & luxury spa.

References

 Lloyds Bank in Bristol -  script by John Sansom, Redcliffe Press. Undated - probably 1980s

Grade II* listed buildings in Bristol
Commercial buildings completed in 1858
Lloyds Banking Group
Grade II* listed banks